The following is a list of the 41 cantons of the Nord department, in France, following the French canton reorganisation which came into effect in March 2015:

 Aniche
 Annœullin
 Anzin
 Armentières
 Aulnoye-Aymeries
 Aulnoy-lez-Valenciennes
 Avesnes-sur-Helpe
 Bailleul
 Cambrai
 Le Cateau-Cambrésis
 Caudry
 Coudekerque-Branche
 Croix
 Denain
 Douai
 Dunkerque-1
 Dunkerque-2
 Faches-Thumesnil
 Fourmies
 Grande-Synthe
 Hazebrouck
 Lambersart
 Lille-1
 Lille-2
 Lille-3
 Lille-4
 Lille-5
 Lille-6
 Marly
 Maubeuge
 Orchies
 Roubaix-1
 Roubaix-2
 Saint-Amand-les-Eaux
 Sin-le-Noble
 Templeuve-en-Pévèle
 Tourcoing-1
 Tourcoing-2
 Valenciennes
 Villeneuve-d'Ascq
 Wormhout

References